The Holdin' My Own Tour was a headline concert tour by Eric Church, in support of his fifth studio album Mr. Misunderstood (2015). The tour began in Lincoln, Nebraska on January 13, 2017 and concluded in Nashville, Tennessee on May 27 of that year.

Background 
Church announced the Holdin' My Own Tour during a performance at Red Rocks Amphitheatre in Morrison, Colorado through a Facebook Live stream. Unlike his previous tours, Church said he will not have supporting acts, and instead, he will headline two fulls sets with an intermission in between sets. Basically at this point in his career, only Eric Church opens for Eric Church.

Battle Against Ticket Scalpers 
Notoriously outspoken about his disgust with scalpers, Church and his team have come up with an intricate digital system that aims to ensure all tickets are sold at face value — and thus kept out of scalpers' hands. On February 21, 2017, Church had to cancel 25,000 tickets purchased by scalpers. Church stated:
It drives me fucking crazy… The problem I have is that scalpers have a bazillion people working for them. And they have those bots that scan. So it's not fair. I've been told to raise my prices. But there's guys out there that want to come to a show and bring their family to a show and are working a blue-collar job, they were there for us in bars and clubs, so I should raise to $100 because that's what the scalpers think? I refuse to believe that.

Tour dates

References

External links
Official website

2017 concert tours